Teather is a surname. Notable people with the surname include:

Charlie Teather (1889–1948), Australian footballer
Paul Teather (born 1977), former English footballer
Robert Gordon Teather (1947–2004), officer of the Royal Canadian Mounted Police who was awarded the Cross of Valour
Sarah Teather (born 1974), British politician

See also
Tether (disambiguation)